Heath is a city in Rockwall and Kaufman counties, Texas, United States. The population was 6,921 at the 2010 census, up from 4,149 at the 2000 census. It is part of the Dallas–Fort Worth metroplex.

History
A proposition was placed on the November 4, 2008, ballot that, if passed, would have changed the name from "City of Heath" to "Village of Heath". Of the 3,511 votes cast, 2,069 (58.9%) voted against the measure while 1,442 (41.1%) voted in favor.

Geography

Heath is located in southwestern Rockwall County at  (32.847890, –96.478273). A small portion of the city——extends south into Kaufman County.

Heath is bordered to the north by the city of Rockwall, to the south by the city of Forney and to the west by Lake Ray Hubbard, part of the city of Dallas.

Demographics

As of the 2020 United States census, there were 9,769 people, 3,109 households, and 2,736 families residing in the city.

Education 
Heath is a part of the Rockwall Independent School District. The city is served by Dorothy Smith Pullen Elementary School, Amy Parks-Heath Elementary School, Linda Lyons Elementary School, Maurine Cain Middle School, and Rockwall Heath High School.

References

External links
 Official website

Dallas–Fort Worth metroplex
Cities in Texas
Cities in Rockwall County, Texas
Cities in Kaufman County, Texas